Alfred Barye "Le Fils" or Alf Barye (Paris, France, 21 January 1839 – Paris, France, 1882) was a French sculptor, of the Belle Époque, pupil of his father the artist Antoine-Louis Barye. In cooperation with Émile-Coriolan Guillemin, Barye did the artwork for "The Arab Warrior Knight on Horseback". Included in Barye's oeuvre were animalier bronzes as well as Oriental subjects. At his father's request, he signed his work as "fils" to differentiate his work from his father's.

Early life
Alfred Barye was born in Paris, France, on 21 January 1839, the son of Antoine-Louis Barye. He learned his craft of animalier sculptor under the watchful eye of his father who was one of the original pioneers of animal sculpture in the mid-to-late 19th century. The younger Barye didn't always get along with his father; there were times when the two of them were not on speaking terms because until instructed not to do so, Barye was signing some of his bronzes as "A. Barye" which the senior Barye objected to because it created confusion as to which Barye, father or son, created the sculpture.

Career

He specialized in the animalier school in the production of bronze sculptures. Although a fine artist in his own right, he struggled to create his own identity living in the shadow of his more famous father. The vast majority of his pieces are signed "A. Barye, fils" while some are marked "Barye" or "A. Barye" which created some confusion – intentional or not – with those of his father. The majority of the sculptures leaving the Barye foundry were sand castings rather than lost-wax castings. Alfred Barye typically used mid-brown patinas but would sometimes add green (a color famously used by his father) and auburn-colored hues in the patination process. Any Barye bronze – by father or son – will generally have an exquisite patina. Antoine-Louis was particularly finicky with his patinas and would not allow other foundries to apply them, preferring to do it himself for appearance and quality control purposes. Alfred, too, would not let a sculpture leave his workshop without a perfectly applied and visually pleasing patina.

Alfred Barye did a production of bronze sculptures and focused his attention on race horses or horses on the move. Some of his well-known bronzes are The Arab Warrior Knight on Horseback (1890–1910, made in Paris, height 87 cm, width 61 cm, depth 30 cm, bronze).

Death and legacy
Barye died in Paris in 1882. He is known for the precision detail in his bronze sculptures, as shown in the pheasant sculpture (pictured right). Barye was known for great attention to detail on his bronzes. He produced a number of bird sculptures as well as genre figures. He received "honourable mention" honors in the 1897 Salon for the work Aide Fauconnier Indien, Retour de Chasse à la Gazelle. Alfred Barye's final submission at the Salon de Louvre was in 1882.

Museum 
His bronzes are now in many museums collections:

 Louvre Museum, Paris
 Musée d'Orsay, Paris
 Brooklyn Museum, New York City
 Fogg Museum, Harvard Art Museums, Cambridge, Massachusetts
 Busch–Reisinger Museum, Harvard Art Museums, Cambridge, Massachusetts
 Arthur M. Sackler Museum, Harvard Art Museums, Cambridge, Massachusetts
 São Paulo Museum of Modern Art, Brasil
 The Israel Museum, Jerusalem, Israel

Exhibitions 
Alfred Barye did several exhibitions in Paris from 1864 to 1882.

 The Salon de Louvre Museum, Paris, 1864 through 1882
 The racehorse Sir Walter Scott, 1865
 Italian jester, 1882

Signature examples

See also 

 Equestrian statue
 Antoine-Louis Barye, the father
 Émile-Coriolan Guillemin
 Animalier
 Belle Époque

References

Bibliography 

 Patricia Janis Broder, Bronzes of the American West, H. N. Abrams, 1974 
 News, Volumi 29–30, Baltimore Museum of Art, 1967
 Musée du Louvre. Département des sculptures, Françoise Baron, Corinne Jankowiak, Christine Vivet, Geneviève Bresc-Bautier, Isabelle Lemaistre, Guilhem Scherf, Jean-Charles Agboton-Jumeau, Sculpture française: Renaissance et temps modernes, Réunion des musées nationaux, 1998
 Théophile Thoré, Les Salons: Salons de 1864–1868, H. Lamertin, 1893
 Stanislas Lami, Dictionnaire des sculpteurs de l'École française, Volume 8, Champion, 1921
 Dictionnaire universel des contemporains contenant toutes les ..., Volume 1, 1870
 Musée du Louvre (Paris). Département des sculptures du Moyen Age, de la Renaissance et des temps modernes, Musée national du Louvre (Paris). Département des sculptures, Sculpture française, Réunion des musées nationaux, 1998
 The Sculpture Journal, Volume 6, Public Monuments and Sculpture Association, 2001
 The University of Rochester Library Bulletin, Volumi 38–43, University of Rochester Library, 1985
 The São Paulo Collection: From Manet to Matisse, Mazzotta, 1989
 Arlene Hirschfelder, Paulette F. Molin, Yvonne Wakim, American Indian Stereotypes in the World of Children: A Reader and Bibliography 
 Fogg Art Museum Handbooks, Editions 4, Harvard University, 1983
 Pierre Kjellberg, Les Bronzes du XIXe Siècle, 1986, (p. 369, "the Arab warrior knight on horseback")
 Eleonora Luciano, William U. Eiland, Georgia Museum of Art, Animals in bronze: the Michael and Mary Erlanger collection of animailer bronzes, Georgia Museum of Art, University of Georgia, 1996
 Elisabeth Hardouin-Fugier, Le peintre et l'animal en France au XIXe siècle, Éditions de l'Amateur, 2001
 Harold Berman, Bronzes; Sculptors & Founders, 1800–1930, Volume 2, Abage, 1976
 Yves Devaux, L'univers des bronzes et des fontes ornementales: chefs-d'œuvre et curiosités, 1850–1920, Éditions Pygmalion, 1978
 Arts Magazine, Volume 17, Art Digest Incorporated, 1942
 Théophile Thoré, 1864–1868

External links 

 "Antique Arabian Horse Sculptures", part II, Judith Wich-Wenning, Tutto Arabi Magazine, p.174-176, www.tuttoarabi.com 
 A patinated bronze figure of a horse in the manner of Alfred Louis Barye late 19th century  height 23 3/4 in. 60.5 cm, Paris. The model is closely related to the celebrated Cheval Turc created by the master French animalier in 1857, price realized 6,250 USD, 22 October 2014, Sothebys New York 
Rhinoceros, bronze, rich green and brown patina, 9.7 by 14.9cm., 3¾ by 6in., price realized 7000 GBP, 04 December 2013, Sothebys London 
 

Equine artists
1839 births
1882 deaths
Animal artists
Sculptors from Paris
Members of the Académie des beaux-arts
19th-century French sculptors
French male sculptors
French orientalists
19th-century French male artists
Belle Époque